The Lonoke Downtown Historic District encompasses a portion of the central business district of Lonoke, Arkansas.  It extends south along Center Street, from the Lonoke County Courthouse to Front Street, and then one block east and west on both sides of Front Street.  It extends eastward on the south side of Front Street another 1-1/2 blocks.  Lonoke was founded as a railroad community in 1862, and this area represents the core of its downtown area for the period 1900–1945.  Most of the district's 23 buildings are commercial structures, one to two stories in height, with brick facades.

The district was listed on the National Register of Historic Places in 1996. Previously listed contributing properties in the district include the Lonoke County Courthouse, the Joe P. Eagle and D. R. Boone Building, the Rock Island Depot, and the Lonoke Confederate Monument.

See also
National Register of Historic Places listings in Lonoke County, Arkansas

References

Historic districts on the National Register of Historic Places in Arkansas
Italianate architecture in Arkansas
Neoclassical architecture in Arkansas
Buildings and structures completed in 1900
Buildings and structures in Lonoke, Arkansas
National Register of Historic Places in Lonoke County, Arkansas